Melaleuca lara is a plant in the myrtle family, Myrtaceae and is endemic to a small area on the west coast of Western Australia. It is similar to Melaleuca ciliosa with its hairy young leaves and heads of yellow flowers ageing to red but there are fewer flowers in each head and the leaves are generally smaller.

Description
The oil glands are distinct.

The flowers are bright yellow fading to red, arranged in heads on the ends of branches which continue to grow after flowering and sometimes also in the upper leaf axils. There are five bundles of stamens around the flower, each with 9 to 13 stamens.

Taxonomy and naming
Melaleuca lara was first formally described in 1999 by Lyndley Craven in Australian Systematic Botany from a specimen near the Z Bend lookout on the Murchison River in the Kalbarri National Park. The specific epithet (lara) is derived from the Ancient Greek word laros meaning "agreeable", "pleasant" or "lovely" referring to the flowers of this plant species.

Distribution and habitat
Melaleuca lara occurs in the Kalbarri district in the Geraldton Sandplains biogeographic region. It grows in sand in heath on sandplains near river gorges.

Conservation status
Melaleuca lara is listed as "not threatened" by the Government of Western Australia Department of Parks and Wildlife.

References

lara
Plants described in 1999
Endemic flora of Western Australia
Taxa named by Lyndley Craven